Ministry of Cultural Heritage, Tourism and Handicraft Organization (Vâzart-e Miras-e Ferhengi-ye, Gârdâshigâri-ye vâ Sânai'-ye Dâsti-ye Iran) is an educational and research institution overseeing numerous associated museum complexes throughout Iran. It is administered and funded by the Government of Iran. It was first established in 1985 by legislation from the Majlis merging 11 research and cultural organizations.  In 2019, Iran Cultural Heritage, Handicrafts and Tourism Organization (ICHHTO), has transferred into the Ministry.  The current Minister is Ezzatollah Zarghami, being appointed 25 August 2021 by President Ebrahim Raisi that he chose by Iranian people directly vote in Iran 2021 Presidential election.

It publishes and oversees the publication of many journals and books, and carries out projects in conjunction with foreign museums and academia. It is similar in scope and activity to the Smithsonian Institution.

Locations
Select list of notable museums and palaces overseen by ICHTO, listed in alphabetical order.
Abgineh Museum of Tehran (Glassware and Ceramics Museum of Iran)
Arg-é Bam
Carpet Museum of Iran
Golestan Palace
Iranian National Museum of Medical Sciences History
Malik National Museum of Iran
Naghsh-i Jahan Square
National Car Museum of Iran
National Museum of Iran
Niavaran Palace Complex
Pars Museum of Shiraz
Pearl Palace (Morvarid Palace)
Reza Abbasi Museum
Sadabad Palace

Some organizations administered by ICHTO
Iran Tourism and Touring Organization
Cultural Heritage News Agency
ICHTO Public Relations Office
Research Center for Conservation of Cultural Relics
ICHTO Documentation Center
Noruz Anthropology Research Center
Technical Office for Preservation Projects of ICHTO
Research Center of the Traditional Arts

Select ICHTO archeological projects
Masooleh Historical Town
Haft Teppe
Ayapir
Chogha Zanbil
Sultaniyeh
Bisutun
Takht-i-Suleiman / Adur Gushnasp
Arg Bam
Persepolis and Pasargad

ICHTO has branches in all Provinces of Iran that administer and operate local projects, sites and museums.

See also
Tourism in Iran
Iranian art
International rankings of Iran
Culture of Iran
History of Iran
Smithsonian Institution
Architecture of Iran
Economy of Iran
Society for the National Heritage of Iran

References

External links
(in Persian) Official website  
(in English) Official website
Visit Iran (Sightseeing information website by the Ministry of Cultural Heritage, Tourism and Handicraft Organization)

Province branches
East Azarbaijan ICHTO
Tehran ICHTO
Khorasan ICHTO
Qazvin ICHTO
Qom ICHTO
Semnan ICHTO
Kerman ICHTO
Isfahan ICHTO
Lorestan ICHTO
Markazi ICHTO
Fars ICHTO
Kermanshah ICHTO
Birjand ICHTO
Kurdestan ICHTO
Mazandaran ICHTO
Sistan and Baluchestan ICHTO
Bushehr ICHTO
Gilan ICHTO
Hamedan ICHTO
Yazd ICHTO
Zanjan MCTH

Heritage organization
Government ministries of Iran
Iran
2019 establishments in Iran
History organisations based in Iran
Cultural heritage of Iran
Iran